Corentin Celton is a station on Line 12 of the Paris Métro in the commune of Issy-les-Moulineaux. It opened on 24 March 1934 as part of the line's extension from Porte de Versailles to Mairie d'Issy.

In 1863, the hospice of the Petits Ménages relocated from the 7th arrondissement of Paris to Issy-les-Moulineaux, leaving a large area for the expansion of Le Bon Marché department store.  The metro station was originally called Petits Ménages because it was located near the hospice, which later became a hospital. In 1945, the hospital and station were renamed to commemorate Corentin Celton, an employee of the hospice and member of the French Resistance, shot by the Nazis at the Fort Mont-Valérien.

Station layout

Gallery

References
Roland, Gérard (2003). Stations de métro. D’Abbesses à Wagram. Éditions Bonneton.

Paris Métro stations in Issy-les-Moulineaux
Railway stations in France opened in 1934